Ziegler & Co. was a Manchester-based Anglo-Swiss producer and distributor of Persian carpets in the late nineteenth and early twentieth centuries. The company had workshops in Tabriz and Sultanabad (now Arak), and it supplied retailers such as Liberty & Company and Harvey Nichols.

The company's designs were modified (often substantially so) versions of more traditional Persian designs, and it used the latest dying techniques and employed the best artisans from the area. The company's carpets tended to have bolder all-over patterns and softer palettes than the livelier traditional Persian carpets.

"Ziegler carpets" long ago became a term used to refer to this style of carpet. Modern-day Ziegler-style carpets are being produced in many countries. Original Ziegler carpets and old carpets with similar designs are often highly valued by collectors.

See also
 Oriental Carpet Manufacturers
 Sultanabad rugs and carpets

References

Further reading
Edwards, A. Cecil. (1953) The Persian carpet: A survey of the carpet-weaving industry of Persia. London: Duckworth.

Persian rugs and carpets
Companies based in Manchester